NSKK:

 National Socialist Motor Corps (Nationalsozialistisches Kraftfahrkorps)
 Nippon Sei Ko Kai (Anglican Church in Japan)